The following is a list of bands that have played nu metal. Nu metal (also known as nü-metal and aggro-metal), is a form of alternative metal music that merges elements of heavy metal with elements of other music genres like hip hop, grunge, alternative rock and funk.

0–9

12 Stones
311
36 Crazyfists
38th Parallel
3rd Strike
40 Below Summer
4Lyn

A 

 A Killer's Confession
 A.N.I.M.A.L.
 Adema
 Alien Ant Farm
 Alpha Wolf
 Amen
 American Head Charge
 Anew Revolution
 Apartment 26
 The Apex Theory
 AqME

B 

 Babymetal 
 Big Blue Monkey
 Bionic Jive
 Black Coast
 Blacklistt
 The Blank Theory
 Blind Channel
 Blindside
 Blindspott
 Bloodsimple
 Blood Youth
 Bloodywood
 Body Count
 Boiler Room
 Boy Hits Car
 Breaking Benjamin
 Breed 77
 Brougham
 Bury Your Dead

C

Cane Hill
Carajo
Chevelle
Chimaira
City Morgue
CKY
Clawfinger
Coal Chamber
Code Orange
Cold
Crazy Town
Crossbreed
Crossfade
Crossfaith
Cyclefly

D

D'espairsRay
Damageplan
Darwin's Waiting Room
The Deadlights
Deadsy
Ded
Defenestration
Deftones
Demon Hunter
Depswa
Destroy the Runner
Dir En Grey
Disturbed
Dope
Downset.
Downthesun
Dragpipe
Drain STH
Dropout Kings
Drowning Pool
Dry Cell
Dry Kill Logic

E 

 E.Town Concrete
 Earshot
 earthtone9
 East West
 Econoline Crush
 Eldrine
 Element Eighty
 Emil Bulls
 Emmure
 Endo
 Eths
 Evanescence
 Exilia

F 

 Factory 81
 Fasedown
 Family Force 5
 Fear Factory
 Fever 333
 Finch
 Finger Eleven
 Fingertight
 Five Finger Death Punch
 Five Pointe O
 Flaw
 Flyleaf
 Flymore
 From Ashes to New
 From Zero
 Fury of Five

G 

 The Gazette
 Genuflect
 Gizmachi
 Glassjaw
 Godhead
 Godsmack
 Guano Apes

H 

 H-Blockx
 Hacktivist
 Hamlet
 Head Phones President
 Headplate
 Hed PE
 Hollywood Undead
 Hoobastank
 Human Waste Project

I 

 Ill Niño
 In This Moment
 Incubus
 Infected Rain
 InMe
 Invidia
 Islander
 Issues

J

Jane Air
Jeff Killed John
Justifide

K

Karnivool
Kells
Kid Rock
Kill II This
King 810
Kittie
Korn

L 

 Tommy Lee
 Lennon Murphy
 The Letter Black
 Lifer
 Limp Bizkit
 Linea 77
 Linkin Park
 Lofofora
 Lollipop Lust Kill
 Lostprophets
 Love and Death

M

Machine Head
Mad at Gravity
Man with a Mission
Manga
Marilyn Manson
Mass Hysteria
Maximum the Hormone
Mayfly
Methods of Mayhem
Mnemic
Motionless in White
Motograter
Mudvayne
Mushroomhead
My Ruin
My Ticket Home

N

No One
Nocturne
Nonpoint
Norma Jean
Jeffrey Nothing
Nothingface
Nova Twins
Nu-Nation

O 

 Ocean Grove
 Oficina G3
 One Minute Silence
 Onesidezero
 Orgy
 Otep

P 

 Papa Roach
 Pillar
 Pitchshifter
 Pleymo
 P.O.D.
 Powerman 5000
 Pressure 4-5
 Primus
 Primer 55
 Professional Murder Music
 Project 86
 Puddle of Mudd
 Pulkas
 Pulse Ultra
 Puya

Q
Quarashi

R

Ra
Rage Against the Machine
Raging Speedhorn
Rammstein
Red
Rev Theory
Reveille
Rico Nasty
Rize

S 

 Sadist
 Saint Asonia
 Saliva
 The Samans
 Scare Don't Fear
 Seether
 Seo Taiji
 Sevendust
 Shinedown
 SHVPES
 Sick Puppies
 Since October
 Skillet
 Skindred
 Skinlab
 Skrape
 Slapshock
 Slaves on Dope
 Slipknot
 Slot
 Smile Empty Soul
 Snot
 Soil 
 Soulfly
 Spineshank
 Spiritbox
 Spoken
 Stabbing Westward
 Staind
 Static-X
 Stepa
 Stereomud
 Stone Sour
 Stray from the Path
 Stuck Mojo
 SugarComa
 Sugar Ray
 Suicide Silence
 Sunk Loto
 Sunna
 Superheist
 Sw1tched
 Sworn In
 Sylar
 System of a Down

T 

 Tairrie B
 Tallah
 Serj Tankian
 Tantric
 Taproot
 Tetrarch
 Thebandwithnoname
 Thousand Foot Krutch
 Three Days Grace
 Tracktor Bowling
 Trapt
 Trust Company
 Tura Satana
 Twin Method
 Twisted Method

U

Ultraspank
The Union Underground
Unlocking the Truth
Ünloco

Y
 Yaksa

V 

 Vanilla Ice
 Vegastar
 Velcra
 Videodrone 
 Vision of Disorder

W

Wargasm
Brian Welch
Wicked Wisdom

Z

Zebrahead
Rob Zombie

See also
List of alternative metal bands
List of rap rock bands

References

Bibliography

 
Nu metal